The Anekal derailment occurred at 7.35 AM on 13 February 2015, when nine coaches of the Ernakulam-bound Intercity Express derailed near Anekal in the Bangalore Urban district of Karnataka, India. Ten people were killed and more than one hundred and fifty injured.

Accident
At 7:35 local time, nine bogies of the Bangalore-Ernakulam Intercity Express (Train No. 12677), operated by Indian Railways, derailed near Anekal in the Bidaragere area near Mulagondapalli and Chandrapuram. The accident occurred in a narrow lane of track. Passengers reported that within 3 to 5 seconds, they felt the carriage suddenly jerk and then the train came to a screeching halt with a loud crash. The D9 compartment crashed into the D8 and its bogie crushed the first 4 rows of seats of the D8 compartment. Many of the D8 passengers were trapped and some were killed.

Rescue and recovery
Karnataka police and fire departments received dozens of calls from eyewitnesses, almost immediately after the derailment. The Karnataka Fire Department and voluntary rescue workers arrived at the scene minutes later and began removing survivors from the coaches.

Investigation
An early press report regarding the upcoming preliminary report stated that the accident was caused by the railway engineers (track supervisors) who allowed the speed limit to be lifted prematurely in an area where a previous broken rail occurred. The report also says that there was no boulder on the track causing the accident.

A preliminary report was issued 17 March 2015 by The Commissioner of Railway Safety which stated the cause was a broken rail. A track worker passed the accident site half an hour before the accident and saw no obvious defects nor any boulder.

According to a news report in January 2016, an official with the railway stated that a final report was sent by Commissioner of Rail Safety (CRS) Satish Kumar Mittal to the railway approximately November 2015. That report, which was still not public at the time, placed the blame chiefly on the Senior Section Engineer with culpability shared by the Loco-Pilot (Train Driver) and the Coach Factory which maintains the passenger coaches.

The report also gives the death toll as 9 with an injury count of only 42.

The Section Engineer was assigned the brunt of the fault because he allowed full running speed on the section of track too quickly after another rail fracture had been repaired a few feet from where this derailment took place. That first fracture and repair had occurred the day before the accident. The Section Engineer was blamed because he allowed full running speed on the section of track less than 24 hours after the repair.

The Coach Factory was blamed for allowing corrosion of the coach's undercarriages to become corroded and weakened which contributed to the severity of the accident. The Pilot was blamed for not having faster reaction time to the incident. The labour union representing the Pilot, The All India Loco Running Staff Association, strongly objected to this assignment of blame. They also claimed the accident was not caused by boulders on the tracks.

References

Railway accidents in 2015
Derailments in India
2015 disasters in India
Rail transport in Karnataka
Railway accidents and incidents in Karnataka
February 2015 events in India
Disasters in Karnataka
History of Karnataka (1947–present)